Zoran Pešić (born 25 September 1983) is a Serbian football defender.

Career
Pešić began his career in 2001 with FK Bane in the Second League of FR Yugoslavia. He later played in the Serbian First League with FK Javor Ivanjica, FK Budućnost Valjevo, FK Radnik Bijeljina, FK Vlasina, FK ČSK Čelarevo, and FK Novi Sad. In 2009, he played in the Serbian SuperLiga with FK Spartak Subotica. The following season he returned to the First League to play with FK Banat Zrenjanin, and returned to the top flight in 2012 after securing promotion with FK Radnički Niš.

In 2014, he played abroad in the Mongolian National Premier League with Erchim FC, and returned to Serbia to play with OFK Bačka. In 2015, he played in the Canadian Soccer League originally with Burlington SC, but was later transferred to London City SC. In 2016, he signed with the Serbian White Eagles FC.

References

External links
 

1983 births
Living people
People from Raška, Serbia
Association football defenders
Serbian footballers
FK Javor Ivanjica players
FK Radnik Bijeljina players
FK ČSK Čelarevo players
RFK Novi Sad 1921 players
FK Spartak Subotica players
FK Banat Zrenjanin players
FK Radnički Niš players
FK Novi Pazar players
FK Radnik Surdulica players
Erchim players
OFK Bačka players
London City players
Serbian White Eagles FC players
Halton United players
Serbian SuperLiga players
Serbian expatriate footballers
Expatriate footballers in Mongolia
Serbian expatriate sportspeople in Canada
Serbian First League players
Canadian Soccer League (1998–present) players